Louis Cha Leung-yung  (6 February 1924 – 30 October 2018), better known by his pen name Jin Yong, pronounced "Gum Yoong" in Cantonese, was a Chinese wuxia ("martial arts and chivalry") novelist and essayist who co-founded the Hong Kong daily newspaper Ming Pao in 1959 and served as its first editor-in-chief. He was Hong Kong's most famous writer, and is named along with Gu Long and Liang Yusheng as the "Three Legs of the Tripod of Wuxia".

His wuxia novels have a widespread following in Chinese communities worldwide. His 15 works written between 1955 and 1972 earned him a reputation as one of the greatest and most popular wuxia writers ever. By the time of his death he was the best-selling Chinese author, and over 100 million copies of his works have been sold worldwide (not including an unknown number of pirated copies). According to The Oxford Guide to Contemporary World Literature, Jin Yong's novels are considered to be of very high quality and are able to appeal to both highbrow and lowbrow tastes. His works have the unusual ability to transcend geographical and ideological barriers separating Chinese communities of the world, achieving a greater success than any other contemporary Hong Kong writer.

His works have been translated into many languages including English, French, Catalan, Spanish, Korean, Japanese, Cambodian, Vietnamese, Thai, Burmese, Malay and Indonesian. He has many fans outside of Chinese-speaking areas, as a result of the numerous adaptations of his works into films, television series, comics and video games.

The asteroid 10930 Jinyong (1998 CR2) is named after him.

Early life
Cha was born Zha Liangyong in Haining, Zhejiang in Republican China, the second of seven children. He hailed from the scholarly Zha clan of Haining, whose members included notable literati of the late Ming and early Qing dynasties such as Zha Jizuo (1601–1676), Zha Shenxing (1650–1727) and Zha Siting (died 1727). His grandfather, Zha Wenqing, obtained the position of a tong jinshi chushen (third class graduate) in the imperial examination during the Qing dynasty. His father, Zha Shuqing, was arrested and executed by the Communist government for allegedly being a counterrevolutionary during the Campaign to Suppress Counterrevolutionaries in the early 1950s. Zha Shuqing was later posthumously declared innocent in the 1980s.

Cha was an avid reader of literature from an early age, especially wuxia and classical fiction. He was once expelled from his high school for openly criticising the Nationalist government as autocratic. He studied at Jiaxing No. 1 Middle School in 1937 but was expelled in 1941. He continued his high school education at Quzhou No. 1 Secondary School and graduated in 1943.

Education 
Cha was admitted to the Department of Foreign Languages at the Central University of Political Affairs in Chongqing. Cha later dropped out of the school. He took the entrance exam and gained admission to the Faculty of Law at Soochow University, where he majored in international law with the intention of pursuing a career in the foreign service.

In 2005, Cha applied at Cambridge University for a doctorate in Asian Studies, which he obtained in 2010. In 2009, Cha applied for another doctorate in Chinese literature at Peking University, which he earned in 2013.

Career 
Cha was a journalist. When Cha was transferred to New Evening Post (of British Hong Kong) as Deputy Editor, he met Chen Wentong, who wrote his first wuxia novel under the pseudonym "Liang Yusheng" in 1953. Chen and Cha became good friends and it was under the former's influence that Cha began work on his first serialised martial arts novel, The Book and the Sword, in 1955. In 1957, while still working on wuxia serialisations, he quit his previous job and worked as a scenarist-director and scriptwriter at Great Wall Movie Enterprises Ltd and Phoenix Film Company.

In 1959, Cha co-founded the Hong Kong newspaper Ming Pao with his high school classmate Shen Baoxin. Cha served as its editor-in-chief for years, writing both serialised novels and editorials, amounting to some 10,000 Chinese characters per day. His novels also earned him a large readership. Cha completed his last wuxia novel in 1972, after which he officially retired from writing novels, and spent the remaining years of that decade editing and revising his literary works instead. The first complete definitive edition of his works appeared in 1979. In 1980, Cha wrote a postscript to Wu Gongzao's taiji classic Wu Jia Taijiquan, where he described influences from as far back as Laozi and Zhuangzi on contemporary Chinese martial arts.

By then, Cha's wuxia novels had gained great popularity in Chinese-speaking areas. All of his novels have since been adapted into films, TV shows and radio dramas in Hong Kong, Taiwan and China. The important characters in his novels are so well known to the public that they can be alluded to with ease between all three regions.

In the late 1970s, Cha was involved in Hong Kong politics. After Deng Xiaoping, a Jin Yong fan, came to power and initiated the reform and opening-up process, Cha became the first non-Communist Hong Konger to meet with Deng. He was a member of the Hong Kong Basic Law drafting committee but resigned in protest after the 1989 Tiananmen Square protests and massacre. He was also part of the Preparatory Committee set up in 1996 by the Chinese government to monitor the 1997 transfer of sovereignty.

In 1993, Cha prepared for retirement from editorial work and sold all his shares in Ming Pao.

Personal life
Cha's parents were Zha Shuqing and Xu Lu. He had four brothers and two sisters, and was the second oldest among the seven of them. His brothers were Zha Liangjian (1916–1988), Zha Lianghao (b. 1934), Zha Liangdong (1930s) and Zha Liangyu (b. 1936). His sisters were Zha Liangxiu (b. 1926) and Zha Liangxuan (1928–2002).

Cha married three times. His first wife was Du Zhifen, whom he married in 1948 but divorced later. In 1953, he married his second wife, Zhu Mei, a newspaper journalist. They had two sons and two daughters: Zha Chuanxia, Zha Chuanti, Zha Chuanshi and Zha Chuanne. Cha divorced Zhu in 1976 and married his third wife, Lin Leyi (b. 1953), who was 29 years his junior and 16 years old when they first met. In 1976, his son Zha Chuanxia, then 19 years old, committed suicide after a quarrel with his girlfriend while studying at Columbia University.

Death 
On 30 October 2018, Cha died after a long illness at the Hong Kong Sanatorium & Hospital in Happy Valley, Hong Kong, aged 94.

His funeral service was held privately at Hong Kong Funeral Home in Quarry Bay in 13 November 2018 with his family and friends, with well known figures including writers Ni Kuang, Chua Lam, Chip Tsao, Benny Lee, producer Zhang Jizhong, actor Huang Xiaoming, former President of the Hong Kong Polytechnic University Poon Chung-kwong, image designer Tina Liu, politicians Tung Chee-hwa and Edward Leong, and founder of Alibaba Group Jack Ma among them in attendance.

At noon, his coffin was moved to Po Lin Monastery at Ngong Ping, Lantau Island, where he was cremated and his ashes was interred at the Hoi Wui Tower’s columbarium.

Decorations and conferments

In addition to his wuxia novels, Cha also wrote many non-fiction works on Chinese history. For his achievements, he received many honours.

Cha was made an Officer of the Order of the British Empire (OBE) by the British government in 1981. He was made a Chevalier de la Légion d'Honneur (1992) and a Commandeur de l'Ordre des Arts et des Lettres (2004) by the French government.

Cha was also an honorary professor at Peking University, Zhejiang University, Nankai University, Soochow University, Huaqiao University, National Tsing Hua University, Hong Kong University (Department of Chinese Studies), the University of British Columbia, and Sichuan University. Cha was an honorary doctor at National Chengchi University, Hong Kong University (Department of Social Science), Hong Kong Polytechnic University, the Open University of Hong Kong, the University of British Columbia, Soka University and the University of Cambridge. He was also an honorary fellow of St Antony's College, Oxford and Robinson College, Cambridge, and a Waynflete Fellow of Magdalen College, Oxford.

When receiving his honorary doctorate at the University of Cambridge in 2004, Cha expressed his wish to be a full-time student at Cambridge for four years to attain a non-honorary doctorate. In July 2010, Cha earned his Doctor of Philosophy in oriental studies (Chinese history) at St John's College, Cambridge with a thesis on imperial succession in the early Tang dynasty.

Works
Cha wrote a total of 16 fictional works, of which only one is a non-wuxia autobiographical short story (Yue Yun). His wuxia works are made up of 2 novellas (White Horse Neighs in the Western Wind and Blade-dance of the Two Lovers), a standalone novel (Ode to Gallantry), 11 interconnected novels of varying lengths, and a novelette ("Sword of the Yue Maiden"). Most of his novels were first published in daily instalments in newspapers, then later in 3 authorised book editions each with various changes to the plots and the characters. There are 4 editions of his novels:
Serialised newspaper/magazine version (1955-1972)
Old edition/1st edition (book form) (1956-1972)
Revised edition/2nd edition (c.1970-1980)
New Revised edition/3rd edition/Century edition (1999-2006)

The works are:

Connections between the works
All of Jin Yong's novels, except Ode to Gallantry are connected, albeit weakly.

Aqing, the protagonist of the novelette "Sword of the Yue Maiden", is the ancestor of Han Xiaoying from The Legend of the Condor Heroes. Demi-Gods and Semi-Devils is a prequel; the Northern Beggar of the Five Greats, Hong Qigong succeeds Qiao Feng as the new chief of the Beggars' Gang in The Legend of the Condor Heroes and Duan Yu is the ancestor of the historical character Duan Zhixing who later becomes Reverend Yideng, another member of the Five Greats. The Legend of the Condor Heroes, The Return of the Condor Heroes and The Heaven Sword and Dragon Saber make up the Condor Trilogy (considered by many to be Cha's magnum opus) and should be read in that order. Dugu Qiubai's Heavy Iron Sword is used by Yang Guo and broken down to create the Heaven-Reliant Sword and the Dragon-Slaying Saber. Guo Xiang inherits the Heaven-Reliant Sword and passes it to her successors in the Emei School. Linghu Chong from The Smiling, Proud Wanderer learns Dugu Qiubai's Nine Swords of Dugu from Feng Qingyang, a reclusive Mount Hua School swordsman. Some characters and schools from The Smiling, Proud Wanderer are mentioned in Sword Stained with Royal Blood. 

In a very brief inner monologue in The Deer and the Cauldron, Chengguan, a knowledgeable but naïve Shaolin monk, ponders two great swordsmen in the past who performed swordplay without following any defined stances: Dugu Qiubai and Linghu Chong. A few major characters from Sword Stained with Royal Blood also appear as minor characters. Wu Liuqi, a historical character from The Deer and the Cauldron, is mentioned in the third edition of A Deadly Secret as the martial arts master of Mei Niansheng. 

Numerous characters from The Book and the Sword appear in The Young Flying Fox, including Chen Jialuo. Hu Yidao, Miao Renfeng, Tian Guinong and the Feng family in The Young Flying Fox are the fictional descendants of the four bodyguards of Li Zicheng, who appears in the Sword Stained with Royal Blood and The Deer and the Cauldron. The Fox Volant of the Snowy Mountain is the sequel to The Young Flying Fox.

Couplet
After Cha completed all his works, it was discovered that the first characters of the first 14 titles can be joined together to form a couplet (duilian) with 7 characters on each line:

Traditional Chinese

Simplified Chinese

Loose translation
Shooting a white deer, snow flutters around the skies;
Smiling, [one] writes about the divine chivalrous one,
leaning against bluish lovebirds (or lover)

Cha stated that he had never intended to create the couplet. The couplet serves primarily as a handy mnemonic to remember all of Cha's works for his fans.

"Sword of the Yue Maiden" was left out because it would be an odd number, thus the couplet would not be complete, also because the "Sword of the Yue Maiden" was so short it was not even considered a book.

Editions

Most of Cha's works were initially published in instalments in Hong Kong newspapers, most often in Ming Pao. The Return of the Condor Heroes was his first novel serialised in Ming Pao, launched on 20 May 1959. Between 1970 and 1980, Cha revised all of his works. The revised works of his stories are known as the "New Edition", also known as "Revised Edition", in contrast with the "Old Edition", which refers to the original, serialised versions. Some characters and events were written out completely, most notably mystical elements and 'unnecessary' characters, such as the "Blood Red Bird" and "Qin Nanqin", the mother of Yang Guo in the first edition.

In Taiwan, the situation is more complicated, as Cha's books were initially banned. As a result, there were multiple editions published underground, some of which were revised beyond recognition. Only in 1979 was Cha's complete collection published by Taiwan's Yuenching Publishing House.

In China, the Wulin magazine in Guangzhou was the first to officially publish Cha's works, starting from 1980. Cha's complete collection in Simplified Chinese was published by Beijing's SDX Joint Publishing in 1994. Meanwhile, Mingheshe Singapore-Malaysia published his collection, in Simplified Chinese for Southeast Asian readers in 1995.

From 1999 to 2006, Cha revised his novels for the second and last time. Each of his works was carefully revised, re-edited and re-issued in the order in which he wrote them. This revision was completed in spring 2006, with the publication of the last novel, The Deer and the Cauldron. The newer revised edition, known variably as the "New Century Edition", "New Revised Edition" and "New New Edition", is noted for its annotations where Cha answers previous criticisms directed at the historical accuracy of his works. In the newer revision, certain characters' personae were changed, such as Wang Yuyan, and many martial art skills and places have their names changed. This edition faced a number of criticisms from Cha's fans, some of whom prefer the older storyline and names. The older 1970–80 "New Edition" is no longer issued by Cha's publisher Mingheshe. In mainland China, it is re-issued as "Langsheng, Old Edition" in simplified Chinese characters.

Patriotism, jianghu and development of heroism

Chinese nationalism or patriotism is a strong theme in Cha's works. In most of his works, Cha places emphasis on the idea of self-determination and identity, and many of his novels are set in time periods when China was occupied or under the threat of occupation by non-Han Chinese peoples such as the Khitans, Jurchens, Mongols and Manchus. However, Cha gradually evolved his Chinese nationalism into an inclusionist concept which encompasses all present-day non-Han Chinese minorities. Cha expresses a fierce admiration for positive traits of non-Han Chinese people personally, such as the Mongols and Manchus. In The Legend of the Condor Heroes, for example, he casts Genghis Khan and his sons as capable and intelligent military leaders against the corrupt and ineffective bureaucrats of the Han Chinese-led Song dynasty.

Cha's references range from traditional Chinese medicine, acupuncture, martial arts, music, calligraphy, weiqi, tea culture, philosophical schools of thought such as Confucianism, Buddhism and Taoism and imperial Chinese history. Historical figures often intermingle with fictional ones, making it difficult for the layperson to distinguish which are real.

His works show a great amount of respect and approval for traditional Chinese values, especially Confucian ideals such as the proper relationship between ruler and subject, parent and child, elder sibling and younger sibling, and (particularly strongly, due to the wuxia nature of his novels), between master and apprentice, and among fellow apprentices. However, he also questions the validity of these values in the face of a modern society, such as ostracism experienced by his two main characters – Yang Guo's romantic relationship with his teacher Xiaolongnü in The Return of the Condor Heroes. Cha also places a great amount of emphasis on traditional values such as face and honour.

In all but his 14th work, The Deer and the Cauldron, the protagonists or heroes are explored meticulously through their relationships with their teachers, their immediate kin and relatives, and with their suitors or spouses. In each, the heroes have attained the zenith in martial arts and most would be the epitome or embodiment of the traditional Chinese values in words or deeds, i.e. virtuous, honourable, respectable, gentlemanly, responsible, patriotic, and so forth.

In The Deer and the Cauldron, Cha departed from his usual writing style, creating in its main protagonist Wei Xiaobao an antihero who is greedy, lazy, and utterly disdainful of traditional rules of propriety. Cha intentionally created an anticlimax and an antihero possessing none of the desirable traditional values and no knowledge of any form of martial arts, and dependent upon a protective vest made of alloy to absorb full-frontal attack when in trouble and a dagger that can cut through anything. Wei is a street urchin and womanizer and seems to have no positive qualities based on a superficial assessment; but he actually embodies the same essential qualities of the heroes from Cha's earlier novels. The fiction writer Ni Kuang wrote a critique of all of Cha's works and concluded that Cha concluded his work with The Deer and the Cauldron as a satire to his earlier work and to restore a balanced perspective in readers.

Criticisms
The study of Cha's works has spun off a specific area of study and discussion: Jinology. For years, readers and critics have written works discussing, debating and analysing his fictional world of martial arts; among the most famous are those by Cha's close friend and science fiction novelist, Ni Kuang. Ni is a fan of Cha, and has written a series of criticisms analysing the various personalities and aspects of his books called I Read Jin Yong's Novels.

Despite Cha's popularity, some of his novels were banned outside of Hong Kong due to political reasons. A number of them were outlawed in the People's Republic of China in the 1970s as they were thought to be satires of Mao Zedong and the Cultural Revolution; others were banned in Taiwan as they were thought to be in support of the Chinese Communist Party. None of these bans are currently in force, and Cha's complete collection has been published multiple times in Mainland China, Hong Kong and Taiwan. Many politicians on both sides of the Straits are known to be readers of his works; Deng Xiaoping, for example, was a well-known reader himself.

In late 2004, the People's Education Publishing House of the People's Republic of China sparked controversy by including an excerpt from Demi-Gods and Semi-Devils in a new senior high school Chinese textbook. While some praised the inclusion of popular literature, others feared that the violence and unrealistic martial arts described in Cha's works were unsuitable for high school students. At about the same time, Singapore's Ministry of Education announced a similar move for Chinese-learning students at secondary and junior college levels.

Timeline

Translations 

Official English translations currently available include:

03. The Legend of the Condor Heroes (2018–2021; four volumes) – published by MacLehose Press (an imprint of Quercus Publishing), translated by Anna Holmwood, Gigi Chang, and Shelly Bryant. The volumes are titled A Hero Born, A Bond Undone, A Snake Lies Waiting, and A Heart Divided.

08.The Deer and the Cauldron (1997–2002; abridged in three volumes only 28 chapters) – published by Oxford University Press, translated by John Minford.

10. The Book and the Sword (2005) – published by Oxford University Press, 2005, translated by Graham Earnshaw, edited by John Minford and Rachel May.

12.Fox Volant of the Snowy Mountain – published by Chinese University Press, translated by Olivia Mok.

Adaptations

There are over 90 films and TV shows adapted from Cha's wuxia novels, including King Hu's The Swordsman (1990) and its sequel Swordsman II (1992), Wong Jing's 1992 films Royal Tramp and Royal Tramp II, and Wong Kar-wai's Ashes of Time (1994). Dozens of role-playing video games are based on Cha's novels, including Heroes of Jin Yong.

Cha's works have also been adapted to comics and television. Those available in English include:
The Heaven Sword and Dragon Saber – in comic book form by Ma Wing-shing, published by ComicsOne
The Legendary Couple – in comic book form by Tony Wong, published by ComicsOne
The Return of the Condor Heroes – in comic book form by Wee Tian Beng, published by Asiapac Books
Laughing in the Wind – DVD collection of the 2001 CCTV series with English subtitles released in the United States.

As film director
Jin Yong co-directed 2 films produced by Hong Kong's Great Wall Movie Enterprises. In both films he is credited as Cha Jing-yong, his official name in Hong Kong.

See also
 Gu Long
 Liang Yusheng
 Woon Swee Oan

References

Further reading
Stateless Subjects: Chinese Martial Arts Literature and Postcolonial History, Chapters 3 and 4. Petrus Liu. (Cornell University, 2011).

External links

 
 Jin Yong Teahouse (金庸茶館) – fansite of Jin Yong's novels in Chinese
 Jin Yong Jianghu (金庸江湖) – fansite, forums and complete works of Jin Yong's novels

 Jin Yong in the Encyclopaedia of Science Fiction 

 
1924 births
2018 deaths
Chinese historical novelists
Hong Kong novelists
C
Hangzhou High School alumni
Alumni of St John's College, Cambridge
Fellows of St John's College, Cambridge
Officers of the Order of the British Empire
Members of the Preparatory Committee for the Hong Kong Special Administrative Region
Wuxia writers
Chevaliers of the Légion d'honneur
Hong Kong newspaper people
20th-century pseudonymous writers
Writers from Jiaxing
Hong Kong Basic Law Consultative Committee members
Hong Kong Basic Law Drafting Committee members
Chinese male novelists
Chinese essayists
People from Haining
Film directors from Zhejiang
Chinese film directors
Hong Kong film directors
Newspaper founders
Politicians from Jiaxing
Chinese emigrants to British Hong Kong